Tam (or Tamas)  Lin (also called Tamlane, Tamlin, Tambling, Tomlin, Tam Lien, Tam-a-Line, Tam Lyn, or Tam Lane) is a character in a legendary ballad originating from the Scottish Borders. It is also associated with a reel of the same name, also known as the Glasgow Reel. The story revolves around the rescue of Tam Lin by his true love from the Queen of the Fairies. The motif of winning a person by holding him through all forms of transformation is found throughout Europe in folktales.

The story has been adapted into numerous stories, songs and films.

It is listed as the 39th Child Ballad and number 35 in the Roud Folk Song Index.

Synopsis
Most variants begin with the warning that Tam Lin collects either a possession or the virginity of any maiden who passes through the forest of Carterhaugh. When a young woman, usually called Janet or Margaret, goes to Carterhaugh and plucks a double rose, Tam appears and asks her why she has come without his leave and taken what is his. She states that she owns Carterhaugh because her father has given it to her.

In most variants, Janet then goes home and discovers that she is pregnant; some variants pick up the story at this point.  When asked about her condition, she declares that her baby's father is an elf whom she will not forsake. In some versions, she is informed of a herb that will induce abortion; in all the variants, when she returns to Carterhaugh and picks a plant, either the same roses as on her earlier visit or the herb, Tam reappears and challenges her action.

She asks him whether he was ever human, either after that reappearance or, in some versions, immediately after their first meeting resulted in her pregnancy. He reveals that he was a mortal man, who, falling from his horse, was caught and captured by the Queen of Fairies. Every seven years, the fairies give one of their people as a teind (tithe) to Hell and Tam fears he will become the tithe that night, which is  Hallowe'en. He is to ride as part of a company of elven knights. Janet will recognise him by the white horse upon which he rides and by other signs. He instructs her to rescue him by pulling him down from the white horse, so Janet "catches" him this time, and holds him tightly. He warns her that the fairies will attempt to make her drop him by turning him into all manner of beasts (see Proteus), but that he will do her no harm. When he is finally turned into a burning coal, she is to throw him into a well, whereupon he will reappear as a naked man, and she must hide him. Janet does as she is asked and wins her knight. The Queen of Fairies is angry but acknowledges defeat.

In different variations, Tam Lin is reportedly the grandson of the Laird of Roxburgh, the Laird of Foulis, the Earl of Forbes, or the Earl of Murray. His name also varies between versions (Tam Lin being the most common) as Tom Line, Tomlin, Young Tambling, Tam-a-line and Tamlane.

Early versions 
The ballad dates to at least as early as 1549 (the publication date of The Complaynt of Scotland that mentions "The Tayl of the Ȝong Tamlene" ('The Tale of the Young Tamelene') among a long list of medieval romances). Michael Drayton's narrative poem Nimphidia (1627) includes a character called Tomalin who is a vassal and kinsman of Oberon, King of the Fairies. Robert Burns wrote a version of Tam Lin based on older versions of the ballad, which was printed in James Johnson's Scots Musical Museum (1796).

The story featured in several nineteenth century books of fairy tales under different titles:

 "Elphin Irving, the Fairies' Cupbearer" in Traditional Tales of the English and Scottish Peasantry by Allan Cunningham (1822)
 "Wild Robin" in Little Prudy's Fairy Book by Sophie May (1866) 
 "Tamlane" in More English Fairy Tales by Joseph Jacobs (1893)

Francis James Child collected fourteen traditional variants in The English and Scottish Popular Ballads in the nineteenth century. (Another Child ballad, Burd Ellen and Young Tamlane, has no connection with this ballad except for the similarity of the heroes' names.)

Motifs 
Child took the threat to take out Tam Lin's eyes as a common folklore precaution against mortals who could see fairies, in the tales of fairy ointment. Joseph Jacobs interpreted it as rather a reversal of the usual practice; the Queen of Faeries would have kept him from seeing the human woman who rescued him.

In some variants, "Hind Etin" has verses identical to this for the first meeting between the hero and the heroine.

Field recordings 
The ballad has been recorded several times from Scottish and Northern Irish people who learned it in the oral tradition. Eddie Butcher of Magilligan, County Londonderry knew a fragment of the ballad which can be heard via the Irish Traditional Music Archive, and Paddy Tunney of Mollybreen, County Fermanagh sang a version to Hugh Shields in 1968. In Scotland, Duncan Williamson of Auchtermuchty, Fifeshire, William Whyte of Aberdeen and Betsy Johnston of Glasgow all had traditional versions recorded, the latter two by Hamish Henderson.

Popular recordings

Following are some of the notable recordings of the ballad, including their artists, titles, albums, and years:

Adaptations

Prose
 John Myers Myers tells a variant in Silverlock (1949)
The Armourer's House, by Rosemary Sutcliff (1951) -- includes a telling of the Tam Lin tale, which parallels the novel's theme of a girl struggling to obtain her dreams.
 Scottish Folk-Tales and Legends, by Barbara Ker Wilson (1954)
 Thursday, by Catherine Storr (1971)
 Red Shift, by Alan Garner (1973)
 The Queen of Spells, by Dahlov Ipcar (1973)
 The Perilous Gard, by Elizabeth Marie Pope (1974)
 Fire and Hemlock, by Diana Wynne Jones (1985)
 Tam Lin by Joan D. Vinge, in Imaginary Lands edited by Robin McKinley (1986)
 Nattens demon (translated from Norwegian as Demon of the Night), by Margit Sandemo (1987)
 Tam Lin: An Old Ballad, by Jane Yolen, illustrated by Charles Mikolaycak (1990)
 Hold Me Fast, Don't Let Me Pass, by Alice Munro, in Friend of My Youth (1990)
 Tam Lin by Susan Cooper, illustrated by Warwick Hutton (1991)
 Tam Lin, by Pamela Dean (1991)
 Tam Lin, in the graphic novel series Ballads and Sagas edited by Charles Vess (1995)
 Winter Rose, by Patricia McKillip (1996)
 Never Let Go, by Geraldine McCaughrean, illustrated by Jason Cockcroft (1999)
 Burd Janet, by Jane Yolen, in Not One Damsel in Distress (2000)
 "Cotillion", by Delia Sherman, in Firebirds, edited by Sharyn November (2003)
 The Dogs of Babel (UK edition: Lorelei's Secret), by Carolyn Parkhurst (2003)
 Tithe: A Modern Faerie Tale by Holly Black (2004)
 "He Said, Sidhe Said" by Tanya Huff, in Faerie Tales ed. Russell Davis and Martin H. Greenberg (2004)
 An Earthly Knight, by Janet McNaughton (2005)
 Blood and Iron, by Elizabeth Bear (2006)
 Summer's Lease, by Eluki bes Shahar (Rosemary Edghill) 
 Roses and Rot, by Kat Howard (2016)

Theatre
The Thyme of the Season by Duncan Pflaster (incorporates elements and allusions to the story)

Film
 Tam-Lin (1970) directed by Roddy McDowall, and starring Ava Gardner.

Novels
 In Carolyn Parkhurst's novel The Dogs of Babel (also known as Lorelei's Secret in the UK), a section of Tam Lin plays a pivotal role in the story.  In it the narrator, Paul Iverson, discovers that his recently deceased wife left an encrypted message to him in their bookshelf, quoting Tam Lin.
 In The House of the Scorpion, a novel by Nancy Farmer, Tam Lin is the bodyguard of the protagonist, the clone of Matteo Alacrán.
 The multi-faceted novel Red Shift by Alan Garner can be read as a subtle reworking of the ballad.
 In the fantasy novel The Battle of Evernight by Cecilia Dart-Thornton, the story of Tam Lin is told as the story of Tamlain Conmor.
 Tamlin appears in the fantasy novel Rumors of Spring by Richard Grant.
 In Jim Butcher's novel Cold Days Tam Lin is referenced as a former Knight of the Winter Court
 A Court of Thorns and Roses by Sarah J. Maas (2015) has a fairy character named Tamlin whom the protagonist saves from an evil fairy queen, but the novel's plot is actually based on "Beauty and the Beast." This Tamlin is a fairy monarch himself who was never human, and actually becomes an antagonist after the first book.

Other
 Tam-Lin, a closet drama written by Elaine Lee and illustrated by Charles Vess, in The Book of Ballads and Sagas, Vess's collection of adaptations of traditional songs, mostly into comics form.
 In the Vertigo comic book, Fables, Tam Lin died in the defence of the last stronghold of the Fables against the forces of the Adversary. He is claimed to be the knight loved by the queen of the faeries, who had a reputation of a scoundrel, but gave up his chance of freedom to his page.
 In the Vertigo comic book series, The Sandman by Neil Gaiman, the notion that Faerie pays a sacrificial tithe to Hell is mentioned in the storyline "Season of Mists".
 In the Vertigo comic book series The Books of Magic, The Names of Magic, and The Books of Faerie, Tamlin is the father of the protagonist Timothy Hunter, potentially the greatest sorcerer in the world. In The Books of Faerie: The Widow's Tale, the story of Tamlin's romance with Queen Titania of Faerie is revealed.
 The story was also inserted in Cecilia Dart-Thornton's last book of the Bitterbynd trilogy, The Battle of Evernight.
 In the Shin Megami Tensei series of video games, Tam Lin is a recurring demon that can often be recruited relatively early and is one of the very few demons whose design share an exact model with another demon – its brother model being another northern European mythological hero, Cu Chulainn.
 This ballad was one of 25 traditional works included in Ballads Weird and Wonderful (1912) and illustrated by Vernon Hill.
 The Rose, The Knight, and The Faery Host are paintings by Stephanie Pui-Mun Law depicting various parts of the Tam Lin legend.
 The Choose Your Own Adventure book Enchanted Kingdom has an ending in which the reader/player's character is rescued from the fairies by a girl whom the character has befriended, who has to hold onto the character through three transformations.
 In Seanan McGuire's October Daye series, the poem is both spoken and referenced over the course of the series, and Janet is a character in some of the later books. The events of the poem occurred in universe.
 Alastair White's fashion-opera WOAD adapts the ballad to explore the implications of multiverse theory.

See also
 List of the Child Ballads
 Gil Brenton
 The Sprig of Rosemary
 Thomas the Rhymer

References

External links

 A website devoted to Tam Lin
 Variant by Burns circa 1792

16th century in Scotland
Border ballads
Middle Scots poems
Child Ballads
Fairies
Legendary Scottish people
Medieval Scottish literature
Narrative poems
Scottish ballads
Scottish folklore
Sexuality in fiction
Shapeshifting
Traditional Celtic fiddle tunes
Yarrow Valley
1549 in Europe
Halloween fiction